The Oshan X70A is a compact CUV produced by Changan Automobile under the Oshan or originally the Chana sub-brand.

Overview

The X70A debuted on the 2017 Guangzhou Auto Show, and was launched on the Chinese auto market on January 27, 2018. Pricing for the X70A ranges from 59,900 yuan to 76,900 yuan slotting above the compact CX70 and CX70T. Seating setup of the X70A is available as 2+2+3 or 2+3 setup.

Powertrain
The X70A is a front-engine rear-wheel-drive layout vehicle with power coming from a 1.5 liter engine with max power of 107hp and peak torque of 145Nm mated to a 5-speed manual transmission.

Design controversies
The exterior design of the X70A was controversial as the styling heavily resembles the Land Rover Discovery Series IV.

References

External links
Official website

Chana X70A
Crossover sport utility vehicles
Cars of China
Cars introduced in 2017